Arthur Laing,  (9 September 1904 – 13 February 1975), a Canadian politician, was actively involved with the BC Liberals, but his primary achievements were federally as a Liberal member of parliament. He served in the cabinets of prime ministers Lester B. Pearson and Pierre Trudeau.

History

Early life
Arthur Laing was born in Eburne, BC on 9 September 1904 to Thomas (1864–1951) and Marion (1870–1949) Laing. His father, a farmer on Sea Island (namely south Eburne), belonged to the group that initiated the BC Federation of Agriculture.

Arthur graduated from the University of British Columbia (UBC) with a Bachelor of Science in Agriculture (BSA) in 1926. He joined the Vancouver Milling and Grain Company that year. He became manager of the Agriculture Chemicals Division of Buckerfields Ltd. in 1933.

Political career
Laing was a member of the Richmond School Board 1930–43, including chair for 8 years. He unsuccessfully ran as the BC Liberals candidate for Delta in 1937 and 1941. Laing was president of the BC Liberals prior to representing Vancouver South 1949–53 in the House of Commons.

He resigned his seat to become leader of the BC Liberals, immediately before the 1953 provincial election. Only three other Liberal candidates were elected to the BC legislature that year. He represented Vancouver-Point Grey 1953–56. He lost in 1956, and in the 1957 Burnaby by-election. After six years in the post, Laing stepped down as the party leader.

Returning as the member for Vancouver South 1962–72, he was Minister of Northern Affairs and National Resources (1963), Minister of Indian Affairs and Northern Development (1966), Minister of Public Works (1968), and Minister of Veterans’ Affairs (1972). He sat in the Senate 1972–75.

Many dignitaries were present among the 700 mourners who attended his funeral.

Marriage and children
In 1937, he married Geraldine Hyland (possibly Highland) (1909–1978). Linda Laurine, an only child, married David Billingsley.

Honours
He was initiated an honorary member of the Blood Band of the Blackfoot Indian Confederacy in 1967. A new government building in Yellowknife was named after him in 1969. He was awarded the Freedom of the City of Vancouver in 1974. Two geographical features, posthumously named in 1975, were the Arthur Laing Peninsula on Ellesmere Island in Canada's northernmost national park (Quttinirpaaq), and the Arthur Laing Peak on the Alaska/Yukon border. Although the name was announced in September 1974, the Arthur Laing Bridge, in Metro Vancouver, did not open to traffic until August 27, 1975 and was officially dedicated on May 15, 1976. He had been a strong advocate for this link. Accepted by daughter Linda on his behalf, he received one of the nine LFS Centenary Awards, issued in 2008, for outstanding achievements of UBC alumni.

Archives 
There is an Arthur Laing fonds at Library and Archives Canada.

References

External links

1904 births
1975 deaths
Leaders of the British Columbia Liberal Party
British Columbia Liberal Party MLAs
Canadian senators from British Columbia
Liberal Party of Canada MPs
Liberal Party of Canada senators
Members of the House of Commons of Canada from British Columbia
Members of the King's Privy Council for Canada
Members of the United Church of Canada
Canadian Ministers of Indian Affairs and Northern Development